Bergonzi is an Italian surname. It is the surname of the following:

 Bernard Bergonzi (b. 1929), British literary scholar, critic and poet
 Carlo Bergonzi (tenor) (1924-2014), Italian singer
 Carlo Bergonzi (luthier) (1683-1747), Italian violin maker
 Charles Bergonzi (1910-??), Monegasque sports shooter
 Jerry Bergonzi (b. 1947), American jazz saxophonist
 Riccardo Bergonzi (b. 1961), luthier
 Caroline Bergonzi (b. 1972), Monegasque sculptor/artist